Alex Torres may refer to:

Alex Torres (baseball), Venezuelan baseball player
Alex Torres (musician), American metal/rock musician

See also

Alessandra Torre (U.S. novelist), erotica author